Tessitura is an enterprise application used by performing arts and cultural organisations to manage their activities in ticketing, fundraising, customer relationship management, and marketing. It refers to itself as "arts enterprise software."

History and business model
Tessitura was originally developed by and for the Metropolitan Opera of New York.

One of the aspects which distinguishes Tessitura from most other commercial software is the business model chosen by the Metropolitan Opera to commercialize what was originally custom software. The Metropolitan Opera maintains ownership of the intellectual property in the original software, but established a separate organization called Tessitura Network (as a not-for-profit corporation with 501(c)3 status under United States tax law) to manage the ongoing development and support of the system. The Tessitura Network now licenses users, handles management, maintenance and development of the system, and fosters an active exchange of best practices and knowledge sharing within the nonprofit arts and cultural sector. The Tessitura Network is effectively a cooperative enterprise, governed via a board elected by and from, and representative of, the licensees of the system.

This business model has an obvious resonance with the not-for-profit and self-governing ethos of the arts community, and is one reason for the dominance Tessitura has rapidly achieved in the (deliberately restricted) market in which it operates–English-speaking, not-for-profit, arts organizations with a need for ticketing and fundraising systems.

System functionality
The Tessitura system is designed to be flexible, customizable, and open, and therefore can be tailored for each organization. Functional areas include ticketing, fundraising, constituent relationship management, Web API, and marketing tools.

Notable users

In the United States

5th Avenue Theatre (Seattle)
92nd Street Y (New York City)
Academy of Vocal Arts (Philadelphia)
ACT Theatre (Seattle)
Adrienne Arsht Center for the Performing Arts of Miami-Dade County
American Repertory Theater
Arena Stage (Washington, D.C.)
Arizona Science Center (Phoenix, Arizona)
Asolo Repertory Theatre (Sarasota, Florida)
Atlanta Opera
Atlanta Ballet
Atlanta Symphony Orchestra
AT&T Performing Arts Center (Dallas)
Austin Opera (Austin, Texas)
Austin Symphony Orchestra (Austin, Texas)
Ballet Austin (Austin, Texas)
Baltimore Symphony Orchestra
Berkeley Repertory Theatre
Boston Ballet
Boston Symphony Orchestra
Brooklyn Academy of Music
Carnegie Hall
Celebrity Series of Boston
Center Theatre Group (Los Angeles)
Chicago Opera Theater
Chicago Shakespeare Theater
Chicago Symphony Orchestra
Cincinnati Symphony Orchestra
Cleveland Museum of Natural History
Cleveland Orchestra
Cooper Hewitt, Smithsonian Design Museum (New York)
Dallas Opera
Dallas Symphony Orchestra
Detroit Symphony Orchestra
Florida Studio Theatre
Folger Shakespeare Library
Fort Worth Symphony Orchestra
Georgia Aquarium (Atlanta)
Goodman Theatre (Chicago)
Grand Opera House (Wilmington, Delaware)
Guthrie Theater (Minneapolis)
High Museum of Art (Atlanta)
Indianapolis Symphony Orchestra
Isabella Stewart Gardner Museum (Boston)
Ithaca College (Ithaca, New York)
Jacksonville Symphony (Jacksonville, FL)
Jacob's Pillow
James Museum of Western and Wildlife Art (St. Petersburg, FL)
Jazz at Lincoln Center (New York)
Kaufman Music Center (New York City)
Laguna Playhouse
Lincoln Center for the Performing Arts
Los Angeles Master Chorale
Los Angeles Opera
Los Angeles Philharmonic
Lyric Opera of Kansas City
Miami City Ballet
McCarter Theatre (Princeton, New Jersey)
Minnesota Opera (Minneapolis, Minnesota)
Minnesota Zoo 
Metropolitan Museum of Art (New York City)
Metropolitan Opera (New York City)
The Metropolitan Opera Guild (New York)
Mondavi Center (Davis, California)
Mount Vernon
Nashville Opera (Nashville, Tennessee)
National Geographic Museum (Washington, D.C.)
New Victory Theater (New York City)
New World Symphony (orchestra) (Miami Beach, Florida)
New York Philharmonic (New York City)
Opera Philadelphia
Opera Theatre of Saint Louis
Oregon Shakespeare Festival
Peace Center (Greenville, South Carolina)
Pennsylvania Ballet
Perot Museum of Nature and Science (Dallas)
Pittsburgh Cultural Trust
Philadelphia Orchestra
Phoenix Symphony
Portland Center Stage (Oregon)
Richard B. Fisher Center for the Performing Arts (Annandale-on-Hudson, New York)
Ruth Eckerd Hall (Clearwater, Florida)
San Diego Symphony
San Francisco Ballet
San Francisco Museum of Modern Art
San Francisco Opera
San Francisco Symphony
SFJAZZ (San Francisco)
San Jose Repertory Theatre
Science Museum of Minnesota
Seattle Children's Theatre
Seattle Opera
Seattle Symphony
Segerstrom Center for the Arts
Shakespeare Theatre Company (Washington, DC)
The Shed (Hudson Yards) (New York City)
Signature Theatre Company (New York City)
Smith Center for the Performing Arts (Las Vegas)
Steppenwolf Theatre Company (Chicago)
St. Louis Symphony
Studio Theatre (Washington, D.C.)
Tennessee Performing Arts Center (Nashville, Tennessee)
Texas Ballet Theater (Fort Worth)
TheatreWorks (Silicon Valley)
Tulsa Opera
University Musical Society (Ann Arbor, Michigan)
University of California, Berkeley – Cal Performances
University of California, Santa Barbara – Arts and Lectures
University of North Carolina at Chapel Hill
Utah Symphony – Utah Opera (Salt Lake City)
Walker Art Center (Minneapolis, Minnesota)
Westport Country Playhouse (Westport, Connecticut)
The Whiting (Flint, Michigan)
Wilma Theater (Philadelphia)
Witte Museum (San Antonio, Texas)
Woolly Mammoth Theatre Company (Washington, DC)
Yale Repertory Theatre (New Haven, Connecticut)

In Canada
Aga Khan Museum (Toronto, Ontario)
Alberta Theatre Projects (Calgary, Alberta)
Arts Club Theatre Company (Vancouver, British Columbia)
Calgary Opera
Edmonton Opera
Edmonton Symphony Orchestra
Harbourfront Centre (Toronto, Ontario)
Kitchener–Waterloo Symphony
National Ballet of Canada (Toronto, Ontario)
Royal Manitoba Theatre Centre
Royal Winnipeg Ballet
Science North (Sudbury, Ontario)
Shaw Festival (Niagara-on-the-Lake, Ontario)
Soulpepper Theatre Company
Stratford Shakespeare Festival
Theatre Calgary
Toronto Symphony Orchestra
Vancouver Opera
Vancouver Playhouse
Vancouver Symphony Orchestra
Victoria Symphony

In the UK
Almeida Theatre (London)
BBC National Orchestra of Wales (Cardiff)
Birmingham Hippodrome (The UK's busiest theatre)
The Bridgewater Hall
The British Museum
Donmar Warehouse (London)
English National Ballet
Glyndebourne Festival Opera
Grange Park Opera
The Hallé (Manchester)
The Old Vic (London)
The Roundhouse (London)
The Royal & Derngate (Northampton)
Royal Academy of Arts (London)
Royal Albert Hall (London)
Royal National Theatre (London)
Royal Opera House (London)
Royal Shakespeare Company (Stratford-upon-Avon)
Sage Gateshead
Southbank Centre (London)
Tate
Theatre Royal, Plymouth
Wales Millennium Centre (Cardiff)
Wigmore Hall (London)
Young Vic Company (London)

In Ireland
Abbey Theatre (Dublin)

In Australia
Adelaide Symphony Orchestra
Australian Museum (Sydney)
Arts Centre Melbourne
The Australian Ballet (Melbourne)
Australian Brandenburg Orchestra (Sydney)
Australian Centre for the Moving Image (Melbourne)
National Gallery of Victoria (Melbourne)
Australian Chamber Orchestra
Bell Shakespeare
Belvoir
Melbourne Festival
Melbourne Recital Centre
Melbourne Symphony Orchestra
Melbourne Theatre Company
Museum of Old and New Art
National Gallery of Australia
Opera Australia (Sydney)
Perth Theatre Trust
Queensland Symphony Orchestra
State Theatre Company of South Australia
Sydney Opera House
Sydney Theatre Company
Tasmanian Symphony Orchestra

In New Zealand
Auckland War Memorial Museum
The Edge Performing Arts & Convention Centre (Auckland)

Notable former users

In the UK

Opera Holland Park (London)

References

External links
 
 

Customer relationship management software
2000 software
Metropolitan Opera